Daniel Bailey (26 June 1893 – 3 April 1967) was an English professional football inside right who played in the Football League for West Ham United, Charlton Athletic and Clapton Orient.

Bailey began his footballing career with Custom House and joined West Ham United in 1912, for whom he made 49 appearances, scoring 13 goals, in the Southern League. After service as a private in Egypt with the Machine Gun Corps during the First World War, Bailey rejoined West Ham making 35 appearances in the club's first seasons in the Football League, and then joined Charlton Athletic in 1922, making 33 appearances and scoring eight goals.  He joined Clapton Orient in July 1922, making 19 League and cup appearances, scoring four goals, in the 1922–23 season after which he joined Margate.

Career statistics

References

English Football League players
English footballers
Charlton Athletic F.C. players
British Army personnel of World War I
1893 births
1967 deaths
Footballers from East Ham
Association football inside forwards
Machine Gun Corps soldiers
Southern Football League players
West Ham United F.C. players
Leyton Orient F.C. players
Margate F.C. players
Military personnel from Essex